This is a list of mayors of Milwaukee, Wisconsin.

List

External links
JS Online

 Milwaukee
Milwaukee, Wisconsin
Mayors